James Robinson was the sixth mayor of Columbus, Ohio.   He served Columbus for eight months.  He is the shortest-serving former mayor of Columbus, Ohio.  His successor was William Long.

References

Bibliography

External links
James Robinson at Political Graveyard

Mayors of Columbus, Ohio
Columbus City Council members